Suqour al-Ezz, also spelled Suqour al-Izz, was a group composed of primarily Saudi jihadists that have been active during the Syrian Civil War.

Founded in February 2013, due to personal disputes with the Islamic State of Iraq and the Levant and the al-Nusra Front, it originally operated as an independent jihadist group while still cooperating on the battlefield with both groups. However, in January 2014, the group joined al-Nusra.

See also
List of armed groups in the Syrian Civil War

References

External links

Anti-government factions of the Syrian civil war
Islamist groups
Islamism in Syria
Jihadist groups in Syria